John Richard Morgan (1854 – 11 April 1937) was a Welsh international footballer who earned ten caps between 1877 and 1883.

Born at Llansamlet, near Swansea, Glamorgan, where his father, the Rev. Morgan Rice Morgan, was Vicar. He was educated at Oundle School and St John's School, Leatherhead, and from 1874 to 1878 studied at Jesus College, Cambridge. where he was awarded in 1877 a Blue for Association Football. He was Assistant Master at Park House School, Reading; Derby School, 1879–1883; and Somersetshire College, Bath. In 1885 he founded with his wife, Katherine Emily Bennett (1887-1942), Connaught House Preparatory School in Weymouth, Dorset. He retired in 1920 and died on 11 April 1937 at 13, Somerset Place, Bath, and was buried at Lansdown Cemetery, Bath, Somerset.

References

1854 births
1937 deaths
Alumni of Jesus College, Cambridge
Welsh footballers
Wales international footballers
Cambridge University A.F.C. players
Notts County F.C. players
Association football defenders